Boiry-Sainte-Rictrude is a commune in the Pas-de-Calais department in the Hauts-de-France region in northern France.

Geography
A farming village located 7 miles (11 km) south of Arras on the D919 road.

Population

Sights
 The church of St. Rictrude, rebuilt after the destruction of the village during World War I.
 The sugar beet factory, one of the largest in France.

See also
Communes of the Pas-de-Calais department

References

Communes of Pas-de-Calais